The Ukrainian frigate Sevastopol was a former Soviet frigate (guard ship) Razitelnyy of the   (NATO codename: Krivak II) ship built for the Soviet Navy in the late 1970s.

Service history

Ukrainian service
In summer of 1997 during the division of the Black Sea fleet she was transferred to the Ukrainian Navy, receiving the name of Sevastopol.

Fate
Sevastopol was decommissioned in 2004 and was sold to Turkey in 2005 as a naval target training.

See also
 Ukrainian frigate Dnipropetrovsk

References

External links
  Guard ship Razitelnyy (Сторожевой корабль "Разительный").

Krivak-class frigates of the Ukrainian Navy
1976 ships
Ships built at Yantar Shipyard
Ships built in the Soviet Union
Military history of Sevastopol